Channel Glacier is a through glacier, extending in an east-west direction across Wiencke Island, between Nipple Peak and Wall Range, in the Palmer Archipelago. It was discovered by the Belgian Antarctic Expedition under Gerlache 1897–99. The name appears on a chart based on a 1927 survey by DI personnel on the Discovery.

See also
 List of glaciers in the Antarctic
 Glaciology

References 

Glaciers of the Palmer Archipelago
Wiencke Island